Me vs. Myself is the fourth studio album by American rapper A Boogie wit da Hoodie. It was released through Atlantic Records and Highbridge the Label on December 9, 2022. The album features guest appearances from Roddy Ricch, Tory Lanez, Kodak Black, G Herbo, Lil Durk, Don Q, and H.E.R.. The deluxe edition was released three days later and included an additional guest appearance from the late PnB Rock for the only newly-added track, "Needed That". Production was handled by a variety of record producers, such as A Boogie himself, S.Dot, P2J, Kofo, Wheezy, Don Cannon, Lee Major, Sean Momberger, Rogét Chahayed, Band on the Beat, Chuck Taylor, OG Parker, Smash David, and Dez Wright, among others.

Background
On the same day the album was released, A Boogie was interviewed by GQ, in which he talked about how the album is different from his previous projects: I feel like every single album, I take a step or two forward. Some of my fans prefer my older songs because they have specific memories from that time that the music is forever tied to. But the truth is, I got better. I would love for my fans to play the first Artist mix tape and then play Me Vs. Myself. I promise you, the quality, the wordplay, everything is better. You wouldn't even think it's the same person.

Release and promotion
On September 5, 2022, A Boogie announced the title of the album and release date and also shared its cover art through social media, which was originally scheduled to be released on November 4. On October 27, he revealed the tracklist, which listed the song titles and blurred out the names of the featured artists for their unreleased songs with him, along with listing which side each song is on: "Artist" or "A Boogie". On October 31, four days before it was originally set to be released, he announced that it would be pushed back to December due to the fact that Canadian rapper Drake and Atlanta-based rapper 21 Savage released their collaborative studio album, Her Loss, the same day.

Singles
The lead single of the album, "Playa", which features American singer-songwriter H.E.R., was released on April 1, 2022. The second single, "B.R.O. (Better Ride Out)", which features fellow American rapper Roddy Ricch, was released on October 7. The third single, "Take Shots", which features Canadian rapper and singer Tory Lanez, was released on October 21. The sole promotional single, "Ballin", was released on November 3.

The single "24 Hours", which features fellow American rapper Lil Durk, was released as the lead single from A Boogie's debut extended play, B4 AVA, on May 21, 2021. The song "Man in the Mirror" is also taken from B4 AVA, which was released on December 10 that year. Both tracks appear on Me vs. Myself.

Track listing

Notes
 "Food for Thought", "Take Shots", "Turn Off the Radio", "I Need It", "Emotions", "Come Here", "Friends with Benefits", "February", "Soul Snatcher", "24 Hours", and "Playa" appear on the "Artist" side.
 "B.R.O. (Better Ride Out)", "Water", "Money Conversations", "Last Time", "Ballin", "Bounce Back", "Damn Homie", "Chanelly", "Regular", "Man in the Mirror", and "Back It Up" appear on the "A Boogie" side.

Charts

References

2022 albums
A Boogie wit da Hoodie albums
Albums produced by Boi-1da
Albums produced by Wheezy
Albums produced by Don Cannon
Albums produced by Lee Major
Albums produced by Rogét Chahayed
Albums produced by OG Parker
Albums produced by Nick Mira